Wong Chan Tong (Francis Wong Chan Tong)  is a civil servant in Macau and the current Director under the Secretariat for Transport and Public Works (Macau) and works for Lau Si Io. He was former head of the Industry, Construction and External Trade Statistics Department of the Macau Statistics and Census Services.

See also
 Politics of Macau

References

Living people
Government ministers of Macau
Year of birth missing (living people)